Cyperus longus is a species of sedge known by the common names of sweet cyperus and water rush in Africa, or in Britain galingale (a variant name of galangal, an unrelated plant).

The species grows in shallow water or on damp ground, such as at pond edges.

The holotype was collected in Italy. It is a widespread species found across Africa, southern Europe, the Indian subcontinent and western Asia. It incidentally occurs in Wallonia as a native. It is also found in western France, south Wales and southern England, where it may or not originally be native. It has recently (since the 1990s) spread northwards to Flanders and the Netherlands where it occurs in scattered adventive populations. It has also been introduced to Tristan da Cunha and Western Australia.

The thick, long, yellowish rhizomes of these plants are traditionally harvested to distil a sweet-scented oil which is used in the perfume industry. The stalks were formerly traditionally processed into paper. There were also folk medicines made from this plant in Europe, the rhizomes being used for stomach aches and the onset of dropsy. It is used at present as an ornamental plant, used for lining ponds.

See also
 List of Cyperus species

References

External links
 
 

longus
Flora of Europe
Taxa named by Carl Linnaeus